Christopher Mills is a Canadian director, editor, animator and cinematographer. He has directed music videos for bands such as Modest Mouse, Interpol, Broken Social Scene, Blue Rodeo, Metric, The Joy Formidable, Senses Fail and Breaking Benjamin. He has also worked on commercials, short films, documentaries, projections and art album covers. Mills' style and work is "Renowned for his unique mix of live action, 2D and 3D filmmaking techniques" according to the writer Anne T. Donahue. "Mills has taken otherwise simple concepts and helped make them magical, transforming each video from a standard visual counterpart to an entirely different form of expression".

Mills has had his work featured in Rolling Stone magazine and on many websites among them Kanye West's blog or MTV.com. He played on Oprah, MTV, MTV2, VH1, Much Music, and other music video networks worldwide. Mills has given retrospectives in respected universities, global film festivals, and at Canada's National Art Gallery. His work has been nominated for and has earned multiple awards, including MTV awards, MTV2 awards, Much Music Video Awards, Juno Awards, International Broadcasting Advertising awards. His video of Interpol's PDA was nominated for an MTV2 Awards in 2003 "Float On", for Modest Mouse, won the MTV "woody" award, was nominated for the MTV "breakthrough video" award, and was nominated for the MTV2 award.

Mills has contributed to and collaborated with musicians and advertisers in a variety of media, ranging from simple drawings for Broken Social Scene's self-titled album (nominated for a "Best Album Art" Juno), to giant stage projections for The Tragically Hip's 2004 oft sold-out stadium tour (later co-winning the Juno for Best Music DVD), to a feature-length experimental documentary film for Canadian cultural icons Blue Rodeo, The Blue Road (2008 Juno winner, "Best Music DVD").

Videography 
Music videos directed by Christopher Mills.

References

External links
Christopher Mills at The Internet Music Video Database

Living people
Canadian music video directors
Canadian animated film directors
Canadian cinematographers
Year of birth missing (living people)
Place of birth missing (living people)
Juno Award for Video of the Year winners